The 1938–39 Serie A season was won by Bologna.

Teams
Novara and Modena had been promoted from Serie B.

Events
The goal average substituted the tie-breaker in event of equal points, to save time considering the risk of war. This change greatly helped Triestina.

Final classification

Note: Ambrosiana-Inter qualified as Coppa Italia winners.

Results

Top goalscorers

References and sources
Almanacco Illustrato del Calcio - La Storia 1898-2004, Panini Edizioni, Modena, September 2005

External links
  - All results on RSSSF Website.

Serie A seasons
Italy
1938–39 in Italian football leagues